

Season summary
Kaiserslautern suffered their worst season since the inception of the Bundesliga. A mere two years after coming within a point of winning the title, they were relegated in 16th place. Although they only lost 10 league games all season - as many as runners-up Bayern Munich - they also only won 6 of those remaining 24 games, the second-worst in the division. There was a silver lining to this season, as Kaiserslautern won the DFB-Pokal for only the second time in their history, ensuring a sixth appearance in European competition in the past seven seasons. Otto Rehhagel, recently ousted from Bayern Munich, was given the task of returning Kaiserslautern to the Bundesliga.

Players

First team squad
Squad at end of season

Left club during season

Competitions

Bundesliga

League table

References

Notes

1. FC Kaiserslautern seasons
1. FC Kaiserslautern